Major-General John Frederick Matheson Macdonald  (1907 – 29 May 1979) was a senior British Army officer.

Military career
Macdonald entered the Royal Military College, Sandhurst, from where he was commissioned into the King's Own Scottish Borderers on 1 September 1927 and served in the Second World War.

He commanded the 1st Battalion, the King's Own Scottish Borderers on its deployment to Korea in April 1951 and then took command of the 28th Commonwealth Infantry Brigade in Korea in October 1951. His brigade saw action at the First Battle of Maryang-san in October 1951 during the Korean War.

He went on to be commander of 31st Infantry Brigade in November 1952, Deputy Director of Quartering at the War Office in January 1956 and Chief of Staff at Scottish Command in March 1957. His last appointment was as General Officer Commanding 52nd (Lowland) Infantry Division in 1958 before retiring in 1961.

Works

References

1907 births
1979 deaths
British Army major generals
Companions of the Order of the Bath
Companions of the Distinguished Service Order
Officers of the Order of the British Empire
King's Own Scottish Borderers officers
British Army personnel of World War II
British Army personnel of the Korean War
Graduates of the Royal Military College, Sandhurst